Beyg Kandi (also Romanized as Beyg Kandī) is a village in Nazarkahrizi Rural District, Nazarkahrizi District, Hashtrud County, East Azerbaijan Province, Iran. At the 2006 census, its population was 90, in 17 families.

References 

Towns and villages in Hashtrud County